Louie Knight is the hero in the Aberystwyth Noir novels, a series of cult detective novels written by Malcolm Pryce set in an alternative universe of the Welsh town of Aberystwyth, and centring on Aberystwyth's one private eye Louie Knight. While rich in black humour, and Chandleresque dialogue, the stories contain serious elements - humour is derived from the Welsh flavour of what is essentially an American style, with nods to the Vietnam war and gangster movies. The main religions in this alternative Wales are both Christianity and the druids, who are power mad gangsters, who use murder, extortion, prostitution, and even the sweet ladies of the sweet justice league to maintain their influence.

Plot summary 
Louie Knight is Aberystwyth's only detective, but this Aberystwyth is a more dynamic, seedy place run by gangsters. In 1961 it contributed many of the soldiers who fought in the Patagonian War (described as a "Welsh Vietnam"), and so 'vets' roam around Aberystwyth disheartened at what they had to do to prevent independence of this Welsh colony (founded by Welsh settlers in real life, although never under direct Welsh, or British, rule). A flood caused by the 'Dambusters' style bombing attack on the Nant y Moch Dam above Aberystwyth wiped out much vital infrastructure, but was rebuilt quickly. The flood had been created to launch an ark being built on the school playing grounds to give the druids access to the semi-legendary (actually real in this universe) Cantref-y-Gwaelod (Cantre'r Gwaelod) . This devastating cultural event undermined the power of the Druids and led to the emergence of new figures; namely the night club owner Jubal, and a meals on wheels lady, who used her food supplies after the flood to gain influence. Louie and his friend Llunos, tried to stop the bombing run over the dam, but failed, something for which he sometimes feels guilty.

A few years on and Louie Knight does most of his work on small-time jobs, but often involving violence; a former lover, Bianca, died in his arms in Aberystwyth Mon Amour, and he nearly lost his assistant 'Calamity' (a nod to Calamity Jane) to a snuff movie in Last Tango in Aberystwyth, and saves his girlfriend, Myfanwy, from an evil genius. In The Unbearable Lightness of Being in Aberystwyth Myfanwy is kidnapped when she and Louie are fed drugged raspberry ripple ice cream. This worries him especially because Myfanwy is very ill, with Louie having to support her in a nursing home on the low earnings of an honest, small town PI. To facilitate this he now lives in a caravan, and has moved his office from the increasingly gentrified Canticle Street to 22/1b Stryd-Y-Popty.

Alternative universe culture 
Casual violence is a part of these books; Louie is tortured, and helps torture people, sometimes aiding police chief Llunos. The mayor is corrupt and unfaithful to his wife, so the police have some leverage for their attempts; unfortunately so do the gangsters. A technique known as 'Welsh roulette' is a favoured interrogation technique, where the number and colour of where the ball lands on the wheel determines what colour 'jack' you are hit with, and how many times (33 red was enough to make Harri Harries give in). As per the Chicago style, people wash up dead on the shore, and some receive concrete boots, or are buried in concrete foundations (hence the ironic saying "this town is built on honest men").

The local prostitutes are usually girls who came to try their hand at modelling, but, as this is Wales, they only get the knitting patterns and pictures in traditional Welsh dress for the lids of fudge boxes ("treadle trollops"). Another diversion from real Aberystwyth is the thriving "What The Butler Saw" movie industry, previously under the control of the Druids. Prostitutes wear stovepipe hats all the time, although very little else - this is a very sly look at traditional Welsh culture.

Politically Aberystwyth is run by a non-democratically elected mayor, who is given leave to act by the gangsters. Outside Aberystwyth the government of the United Kingdom is assumed, but not confirmed, to be similar to the real system; Wales and England are not independent states, so presumably this universe had 'The Act of Union' as well. Notably Wales retains a Foreign Legion, (referred to by Louie as "the only real military") which fought the Patagonian War, and had sufficient autonomy to have sponsored the 'Ysbyty Ystwyth' Experiment into neural reprogramming. In Don't Cry For Me Aberystwyth it is revealed that there is also a division of 'Welsh Intelligence', albeit run on the cheap (having devised the 'pie man' style of surveillance) who are running black ops against Mossad (again, on the cheap) to cover up Welsh errors during the Patagonian War.

O levels and a grant system (instead of Top-up fees) still exist for students. Aberystwyth has a University, as does Lampeter, although the latter seems to specialise in undertaking and religious subjects ('media studies' for example refers to mediums) – the real University of Wales, Lampeter was founded as a theological college. Louie's education involved Latin implying he grew up under a Grammar school system, but he is one of the last to do this. Llunos, who is older than Louie, reads Ulrico in the original Latin.

Elements of real Wales do exist however; Louie is particularly fond of cawl (a Welsh stew), there are donkey rides on the promenade (run by Louie's father), and Welsh is still spoken, although most people seem to use English for day to day usage. Various landmarks mentioned (such as the National Library of Wales) do exist in real life, although the 'Moulin' club, where the gangsters operate from, does not. Welsh transliteration of English is also a feature in both universes, such as Mikey → Meici, Saucepan → Sospan and Brainbox → Brainbocs.

The Patagonian War 
In the alternative universe of the Louie Knight series Wales fought a war against separatists in the Welsh colony of Patagonia in 1961. The Welsh Foreign Legion was tasked with fighting it and expanded using a massive recruitment drive centred on Aberystwyth (a recruiting centre was above an outlet of Boots in Aberystwyth) sending thousands out there. A famous battle was at Rio Ceiriog - a bombing raid on the main guerilla base in the mountains, using a radio targeting system hidden inside a Rolex watch: something that modern day children learn about as a great victory. In Aberystwyth Mon Amour Cadwaladr introduced Louie to former Private Pantycelyn who revealed that the raid was a failure - the watch, which had been purposely lost to the guerillas in a game of Poker, was donated by the guerillas to an orphanage instead, and its destruction made the village rise up and nearly kill the force, who had been disguised as UN peacekeepers to get behind enemy lines. In another sly nod to war films the 'Boys from the back room' are Llanelli Technical College, who designed the homing beacon for Rio Ceiriog and the world's only microdot photobooth (now stored at Aberystwyth's museum).

The legacy of this unpopular war was veterans who were traumatised by their actions there, and often unable to find work when they returned. They would often become scapegoats for crimes, as happened to Rimbaud in The Unbearable Lightness. Pantycelyn returned with an arm amputated, so was unable to work on his parents' farm near Cader Idris; stories very reminiscent of experiences from the Vietnam War in our universe.

Dramatis personae 
Main characters across the series only

Louie Knight is Aberystwyth's one private detective. He is a bitter, cynical man haunted by the death of his best friend Marty at school, by his inability to stop the dam raid and various old loves who have suffered various tragedies, notably Bianca and Myfanwy. After working as a policeman in Swansea he became a PI and moved to Aberystwyth, although what made him leave regular policing is never explained. He is passionately in love with Myfanwy, only taking her case because he loved her in Mon Amour. His agency is called Knight Errant investigations (a joke he now winces at), although his card reads Louie Knight, Gumshoe. He has a long running hatred of Mrs. Llantrisant (who plays a role as infrequent Moriarty to Louie's Holmes). Working out of an office at 22/1b Stryd-Y-Popty he is unaware he is a detective living in what literally translates as 'Baker Street', and he lives in a caravan so that he can swim in the sea, where he feels most relaxed under the waves. He drinks Captain Morgan rum, preferring it to the stereotypical whisky because, despite a similar alcohol content, rum comes from sunny islands, while whisky comes from Scotland.

As regards the 'backstory', Louie never knew the love of a mother, as she died when he was only one year old - he has a picture of her on his desk. Notably an ancestor, Noel Bartholomew, went to Borneo during the Victorian era to rescue a woman he had never met, so Louie suspects there is a 'stupid errands' gene in his family, especially as his ancestor died on that mission. Bartholomew's journal is stored by Louie, along with a shrunken head in a trunk, and a map of Borneo on the wall. The other picture in Louie's office is that of Humphrey Bogart in Casablanca - symbolic of many a loner, and in tune with the "noir" feel of the series.

Myfanwy Montez was a beautiful nightclub singer from before the flood, and one of the few women to capture Louie's heart. She also captured the heart of Dai Brainbocs, who later kidnapped her. So far she is living in a nursing home paid for by Louie, who still loves her madly. She suffered the debilitating after effects of a love potion, concocted by Dai to try to make her love him; a potion based on neurochemistry, so very dangerous. By the end of The Unbearable Lightness Dai seemed to have found a cure for what was killing her, but this is by no means assured. In Don't Cry For Me Aberystwyth she has improved, but is given to bouts of darkness - running away from Louie until he hunted her down (chasing the Shrewsbury bus) and convinced her that he still loved her.

"Calamity" Jane, originally from Machynlleth, is Louie's assistant, whom he met as a tout in the Bingo hall during Aberystwyth Mon Amour. Aged 18 by The Unbearable Lightness she is more optimistic than Louie, and seems to base her detective technique on films. She investigated the old fire at Nanteos for a strange client, Gabriel Bassett, to gain her detectives licence. Her relationship with Louie is purely platonic, but no other lover of hers has been mentioned so far.

Dai Brainbocs is the evil scientific genius who Louie runs into. Dai is obsessed with Myfanwy and abducted her twice to try to make her love him. Physically he stopped growing aged 14, and has to use a wheelchair to get about. A truly brilliant school boy genius who discovered Cantref Gwaelod, reads and writes runes and even faked his own death in Mon Amour, he is described as a danger to humanity. His Promethean urge to do the unthinkable makes him dangerous, as does his emotional and moral detachment from experiments (e.g. trying to clone Jesus). At the end of The Unbearable Lightness he had found a potential cure for Myfanwy, and had turned his hideout into Myfanwy's idea of heaven as described in a school essay she wrote aged 9. What happened to him after he cured Myfanwy is not explained in the latest book, but he may have been returned to Shrewsbury prison.

Police Chief Llunos is tasked with keeping order in Aberystwyth. Hampered by official corruption and a limited budget he still tries to help Louie wherever possible. Both he and Louie were in the plane that bombed the dam attempting to stop it. His grandfather was one of the first 'Peelers' (Policeman) in Britain, something Llunos feels proud of; he is writing a book about him during The Unbearable Lightness. He is a cultured man who, despite his brutality, quotes Shakespeare (The Merchant of Venice in The Unbearable Lightness) and reads Latin. He has as a 'thinking spot' an old police office in Aberystwyth that has been abandoned - it is here that he keeps the infant skulls discovered at the Waifery. The willingness of central Police division to send him officers from Swansea to subvert his authority suggests he has made enemies higher up in the hierarchy.

Sospan (Welsh for 'Saucepan'); the promenade's ice-cream seller cum philosopher, and tipster to Louie. It is implied that he has a dark past, but Louie wonders whether his dark secret is that he has no secret. He specialises in weird ice cream flavours, such as absinthe, and has ironic names for his ice cream, notably his (now withdrawn) "hornucopia". Many fans believe he did covert work during the Patagonian war, although the jagged scar on his cheek is the only evidence of a more violent previous life. The opening chapter of Aberystwyth Mon Amour quotes him as saying he does not have friends, because he loses too many work days attending funerals, which is symbolic of Sospan's moral detachment. In The Unbearable Lightness he orders Louie never to ask him how he came by his scar, and it is revealed that in all the time Louie has known him he has never left his booth. He tells Louie that he has an arrangement with the local magistrate -"I don't judge and he doesn't sell ice-cream in his court".

Eeyore is Louie's father, and the man who runs donkey rides along the promenade. Previously a member of the local police force, he retired early for reasons unknown; his career involved tracking Frankie Mephisto (a gangster) and arresting a Raven (a Druid assassin). A widower, he is devoted to his son and also his donkeys. His name is, unsurprisingly, a reference to Eeyore.

Mrs. Llantrisant swabbed Louie's steps in Aberystwyth Mon Amour, but also led a double life, plotting to destroy the Aberystwyth dam. Having originally gone over as a prostitute, she later became famous as a fighter during the Patagonian War where Lieutenant Llantrisant was more often known as Gwenno Guevara - a ruthless fighter and torturer. She wrote a book about forensic meteorology called "Red Sky at Night", which Calamity used to solve the riddle of the Nanteos fire. She was head of ESSJAT - an elite secret force of radical Christians against corruption, hence her interest in creating a flood...another deluge. After her role as bombardier for the dam raid she was imprisoned on an island near Aberystwyth until she escaped in Last Tango and with Herod Jenkins. At the end of Last Tango she is missing, believed dead and in Don't Cry for Me she is in a travelling circus dying of some unknown illness (potentially voodoo magic). It is not known why she is known as Mrs. Llantrisant, and there has never been mention of a Mr Llantrisant.

Herod Jenkins is Louie's old PE teacher, and responsible for sending Louie's best friend Marty on a cross country run in weather that "even the SAS on the Brecon Beacons would have avoided". He has a squat but powerful physique, and a thin lipped smile that Louie believes looks more like a post box slot than a sign of affection. Louie believed he had killed Herod in Aberystwyth Mon Amour by knocking him out of the bomber, but he survived the fall and lost his memory. During Last Tango he was re-programmed to believe he was Hungarian by the Welsh Army for an experiment, but latent memories of Rugby union and his lover Mrs. Llantrisant caused him to remember his true identity and he escaped the Police with Mrs. Llantrisant over the mountains. He returns as a circus strong man, and later under the alias 'Hoffman' in Don't Cry For Me Aberystwyth where we learn that he worked as a torturer in South America where he was involved with the Nazis. 'Hoffman' was derived from his German codename HFM (an abbreviation of the German for 'Horizontal smile man') and as such Mossad have been hunting him ever since the name 'Hoffman' emerged during the interrogation of Adolf Eichmann.

Cadwaladr fought in the Patagonian war, and is one of the few remaining veterans who still live in Aberystwyth. Having met Louie over a luxurious picnic in Mon Amour he later saved Louie from the police when he was accused of Bianca's murder, helped Louie track down Calamity in Last Tango, and defended Rimbaud (another veteran) when Rimbaud was the chief suspect in Myfanwy's abduction. His experiences haunt him, and he has flashbacks to killing and fighting in Patagonia. He had a job painting the Borth Bridge year after year, but in Don't Cry for Me they developed a new kind of paint which lasts 10 years robbing him of a job, but giving him a large severance pay. He now lives in a camper van.

Aberystwyth Noir books 
Aberystwyth Mon Amour, 2001, Bloomsbury Publishing, 
Last Tango in Aberystwyth, 2003, Bloomsbury Publishing, 
The Unbearable Lightness of Being in Aberystwyth, 2005, Bloomsbury Publishing, 
Don't Cry for Me Aberystwyth, 2007, Bloomsbury Publishing, 
From Aberystwyth with Love, 2009, Bloomsbury Publishing, 
The Day Aberystwyth Stood Still, 2011, Bloomsbury Publishing,

Radio play
Louie Knight, Calamity, Sospan, Eeyore and Herod Jenkins appear in  Aberystwyth Noir - It Ain't Over till the Bearded Lady Sings, a BBC Radio 4 Afternoon Drama written by Pryce, first broadcast on 15 May 2013, produced and directed by Kate McAll.

Notes 

Fictional private investigators
Anglo-Welsh novels
Aberystwyth
Parody novels